António Sérgio Lopes Tavares (born 12 June 1987) is a Cape Verdean international footballer who plays for Portuguese club S.C.U. Torreense, as a midfielder.

Career
Born in Tarrafal, Tavares has played for Estrela dos Amadores, Sporting Clube da Praia, Anadia, Primeiro de Agosto, Benfica de Luanda and Oriental de Lisboa. In June 2016 he signed for Académica.

He made his international debut for Cape Verde in 2009.

References

External links

1987 births
Living people
Cape Verdean footballers
Association football midfielders
People from Tarrafal
Footballers from Santiago, Cape Verde
Estrela dos Amadores players
Sporting Clube da Praia players
Santiago South Premier Division players
C.D. Primeiro de Agosto players
S.L. Benfica (Luanda) players
Liga Portugal 2 players
Segunda Divisão players
Anadia F.C. players
Casa Pia A.C. players
Clube Oriental de Lisboa players
Associação Académica de Coimbra – O.A.F. players
S.C.U. Torreense players
Cape Verde international footballers
Cape Verdean expatriate footballers
Expatriate footballers in Angola
Expatriate footballers in Portugal
Cape Verdean expatriate sportspeople in Angola
Cape Verdean expatriate sportspeople in Portugal